The 2013 Aberto de São Paulo was a professional tennis tournament played on hard courts. It was the 13th edition of the tournament which was part of the 2013 ATP Challenger Tour. It took place in São Paulo, Brazil between 31 December 2012 and 6 January 2013.

Singles main-draw entrants

Seeds

 1 Rankings are as of December 24, 2012.

Other entrants
The following players received wildcards into the singles main draw:
  Rafael Camilo
  Daniel Dutra da Silva
  Tiago Lopes
  Thiago Monteiro

The following players received entry from the qualifying draw:
  Devin Britton
  André Ghem
  Austin Krajicek
  Franko Škugor

Doubles main-draw entrants

Seeds

1 Rankings as of December 24, 2012.

Other entrants
The following pairs received wildcards into the doubles main draw:
  Rafael Camilo /  Daniel Dutra da Silva
  Rogério Dutra da Silva /  Eduardo Russi
  Ricardo Hocevar /  Leonardo Kirche

Champions

Singles

 Horacio Zeballos def.  Rogério Dutra da Silva, 7–6(7–5), 6–2

Doubles

 James Cerretani /  Adil Shamasdin def.  Federico Delbonis /  Renzo Olivo, 6–7(5–7), 6–1, [11–9]

External links
Official Website

Aberto de Sao Paulo
Aberto de São Paulo
Aberto de São Paulo
Aberto de São Paulo
Aberto de São Paulo